Trace Hits (formerly Chart Show TV and Trace Urban) is a British free-to-air music channel owned by Trace Group.

History

Chart Show TV launched on 16 September 2002 and initially consisted of several different charts, mimicking the format of the television show upon which it was based. However, many of these were dropped and the channel started showing music videos.

The channel broadcast in 4:3 from its launch but switched to 16:9 on 4 February 2008. All of CSC Media Group's other music channels have also switched to 16:9 broadcasting. A new website for Chart Show TV is also under development since its sister channels have had new websites launched.

On 5 January 2012, Chart Show TV +1 launched, replacing NME TV. The temporary channel was replaced by BuzMuzik on 30 May 2012.

On 1 May 2014, Chart Show TV got a new look with a .tv screen (with 'chart show' being only seen at the beginning of a music video, not to be confused with the defunct channel .tv, which closed in 2001). However, Chart Show Dance continued to have the old look until 13 June 2014.

In December 2018, Trace Group acquired Chart Show TV from Sony Pictures Television.

On 1 November 2019, Chart Show TV was rebranded as Trace Urban following Trace's takeover of Sony's music channels. The last song to be played before the rebrand was "Big for Your Boots" by Stormzy but was cut halfway through the song similarly to the sister channels' changes. The channel introduced blocks from former sister channels Starz TV and Trace Latina on 1 June 2020.

On 1 October 2020, the channel rebranded to Trace Xmas, taking over from defunct sister channel Starz TV. This was repeated on 2021 and on 2022.

On 5 January 2021, the channel has been rebranded to Trace Hits. The last song to be played before the rebrand was "Breaking Me" by Topic & A7S, the first song to be played after the rebrand was "Really Love" by KSI, Craig David & Digital Farm Animals.

Freeview
On 8 May 2014, Chart Show TV was launched on Freeview, on channel 67. It became a placeholder on 3 September 2014 along with the Freeview retune, and was removed from Freeview on all regions, including London, except in Manchester on 8 September.

It was removed from Manchester Freeview in November 2017, and was replaced with sister channel Trace Vault, though both channels could be found on Freeview via Channelbox (Freeview Channel 271) in the streamed section alongside 'GImux' channels Clubland TV, Country Music Entertainment and Now 90s.

On 27 June 2022, a trio of Trace music channels were launched on Channelbox with Trace Urban, Trace Latina and Trace Brazuca replacing Trace Vault and Trace Hits, in a section on channel 271 which now included Zoom, Balle Balle and Stingray's channels (Qello, CMusic and Karaoke) rather than Universal's Now Music channels.

Former Programming 
 Chart Show Chat - Music and interviews with artists and groups, presented by Stefanie Faleo.
 Chart Show's Top 20/40 Singles Chart - A weekly countdown of the top 20/40 singles with James Barr.
 Global Hits! - The world's biggest hits throughout the early breakfast hours.
 New Music Now! - The latest songs added to the Chart Show TV playlist.
 Pop Quiz, Let's Test ya! - A selection of pop music-related questions whilst showing the latest pop music videos.
 Request - An interactive show where a set of 4 songs at a time can be chosen by tweeting the relevant hashtag, the hashtag with the most votes is then played next and this process is repeated. Show was previously on Bliss and then Chart Show Dance.
 Top 20 Urban Chart Rollers - 20 biggest urban tracks of the week.
 Top 20 US Single Chart - Songs that are in position 20 to 1 on the week's US Single Chart.

On-air identity

As Chart Show TV, the logo was on screen in the top left-hand corner during music videos. The song information appeared in a moving equalizer type graphic at the start and near the end of each music video. The same graphics are also used for the new Singles, Urban, Dance and Download Charts. The channel's identity was also seen before and after advert breaks when the Chart Show TV logo spun in the centre of the screen. On 14 May 2013, the onscreen identity in the top left hand side of the screen had the headphones removed.

Upon rename to Trace Urban, the idents are similar to Trace Vault and formerly Trace Latina, but with a shade of orange, reflecting the channel's logo. In early 2020, the Trace-branded channels and Starz TV had their top right corner graphics removed, but was reinstated upon temporary rename to Trace Xmas on 1 October 2020, whose idents featured a shade of green. Upon rename to Trace Hits, the idents remained the same, but with a shade of pink.

References

External links
 

CSC Media Group
Music video networks in the United Kingdom
Television channels and stations established in 2002
2002 establishments in the United Kingdom
Black British music